York Street station is a TECO Line streetcar station in Tampa, Florida. It is located at York Street and Channelside Drive.

See also

Light rail in the United States
List of streetcar systems in the United States
Streetcars in North America
Transportation in Florida

References

Railway stations in the United States opened in 2002
TECO Line Streetcar System stations
2002 establishments in Florida